The Ministry of Industry and Information Technology is the sixth-ranked executive department of the State Council of the People's Republic of China that is responsible for regulation and development of the postal service, Internet, wireless, broadcasting, communications, production of electronic and information goods, software industry and the promotion of the national knowledge economy.

The Ministry of Industry and Information Technology is not responsible for the regulation of content for the media industry. This is administered by the State Administration of Radio, Film and Television. The responsibility for regulating the non-electronic communications industry in China falls on the General Administration of Press and Publication.

History 
The State Council announced during the 2008 National People's Congress that the Ministry of Industry and Information Technology will supersede the Ministry of Information Industry (MII).

In 2013, the ministry's 'Made in China 2025' plan was approved by the State Council. It took over two years to complete by one hundred and fifty people. The plan's aim is to improve production efficiency and quality.

Organization 
The ministry includes the State Administration for Science, Technology and Industry for National Defense, the State Council Informatization Office and the State Tobacco Monopoly Bureau.

The MIIT was historically responsible for the nation's tobacco control, but this task was assigned to the National Health Commission as part of a large-scale government reform in 2018.

Under the arrangement "one institution with two names", the MIIT reserves the external brands of the China National Space Administration and the China Atomic Energy Authority.

Structure

List of ministers

List of party secretaries

Censorship 
The organisation is known for drafting regulations that lays the groundwork for censorship. Humans Rights Watch has alleged that the organisation is responsible for overseeing technical implementation of the censorship in China.

See also 

List of telecommunications regulatory bodies
China Electronics Technology Group
China Software Industry Association
Electronic information industry in China
Industry of China
Software industry in China
Standardization Administration of China SAC
Ministries of China
Roscomnadzor

References

External links 
 Ministry of Industry and Information Technology Official Website
 China Information Industry website

 
Information Industry
China
PRC
PRC
Ministries established in 2008
2008 establishments in China
Organizations based in Beijing